Volkhart is a German-based given name and surname. Notable people with the name include:

Volkhart Buchter (born 1944), German rower, West German Olympian
Kurt C. Volkhart (1890-1959), German engineer, race driver and first driver of rocket powered car
Max Volkhart (1848-1924), German painter and etcher

See also
Volhard